Teatro La Perla is a historic theater in the city of Ponce, Puerto Rico. Inaugurated in 1864, it is the second oldest theater of its kind in Puerto Rico, but "the largest and most historic in the Spanish-speaking Caribbean." The theater was named La Perla in honor of the Virgin of Montserrat (Spanish: La Virgen de Montserrat), known as "The Pearl of the Mediterranean." It is located in barrio Tercero, in the Ponce Historic Zone.

Design
The theater was designed in the 1860s by Juan Bertoli Calderoni (a Ponceño of Italian heritage resident of the city) and it bears a neoclassical structure with an impressive six-column entrance. The building was badly damaged by the 1918 earthquake. However, it was rebuilt in 1940 using the original plans and reopened in 1941 with better acoustics technology. It closed in 2006 for renovations and reopened on 14 March 2008.

History
Teatro La Perla was built under the initiative of Francisco Parra Duperón and Pedro Garriga in May 1864. It was inaugurated on 28 May 1864 with the play La campana de la Almudaina of the Majorcan writer Juan Palou y Coll by the theatrical company of Segarra & Argente.

Teatro La Perla served as a stage not only to give life to the theatrical artistic culture in the region, but it also served as a place of assembly for those who were dedicated to the social issues in Ponce and in Puerto Rico as a whole. It served this function both at the end of the Spanish regime and in Puerto Rico's early years as a United States territory.

In this theater, in 1901, Frenchman Eduardo Hervet showed the first silent film ever to be run in Puerto Rico. The theater's first illumination technical director was Félix Juan Torres Ortiz.

It was significantly rebuilt by Lorenzo J. Vizcarrondo, an engineer, "a few years before" 1913, to make up for the deterioration it had suffered over years of less-than-complete upkeep. It was again reconditioned between 1977 and 1979 at a cost of over $500,000. After Hurricane Maria it closed for a year, reopening on 1 November 2019.  It was listed on the US National Register of Historic Places on 27 September 2021 ("La Perla Auditorium and Public Library").

Capacity and museum
The theater has a seating capacity of 1,047 and is now a regular venue for concerts, opera, plays, and various civic and educational activities such as school graduations. The lobby of the theater has a small museum dedicated to the history of the building and past shows.

Prominent events
Teatro La Perla has been host to several significant events, among them:

 7–9 March 1887: political assembly that gave birth to the Puerto Rico Autonomist Party.
 16 April 1896: Juan Morel Campos suffers a stroke while performing on stage and died three weeks later
 February 1987: inauguration of the Festival de Teatro Luis Torres Nadal

See also
 List of theaters of Ponce, Puerto Rico

Notes

References

External links
 Picture of the Theatre
 Information on various sites of Ponce
 Contact information
 Damage to Teatro La Perla by the 1918 earthquake
 Photo of Teatro La Perla in 1910, looking ENE

Theatres completed in 1864
Theatres completed in 1940
Neoclassical architecture in Puerto Rico
Theatres in Ponce, Puerto Rico
Concert halls in Puerto Rico
Music venues in Ponce, Puerto Rico
Opera houses in Puerto Rico
National Register of Historic Places in Ponce, Puerto Rico
Theatres on the National Register of Historic Places in Puerto Rico
1864 establishments in Puerto Rico
Rebuilt buildings and structures